A Calculus of Angels is an alternate history and fantasy novel by American writer Gregory Keyes, the second book in The Age of Unreason series. It was initially published by Del Rey on March 30, 1999. A follow up to Newton's Cannon, the book is set in 1722 and continues the alternate history where Isaac Newton discovers that alchemy works, and a powerful science is built upon it.

References

External links

Sources
 "A Calculus of Angels (Book)." Publishers Weekly 246.12 (22 March 1999): 74.
 Green, Roland. "Adult books: Fiction." Booklist 95.16 (15 April 1999): 1518.
 Cassada, Jackie, and Barbara Hoffert. "Book Reviews: Fiction." Library Journal 124.7 (15 April 1999): 148.
 Vretos, Linda A., and Trevelyn E. Jones. "Adult/Young Adult: Fiction." School Library Journal 46.1 (January 2000): 156.

1999 American novels
1999 science fiction novels
1999 fantasy novels
American steampunk novels
American alternate history novels
Science fantasy novels
Novels by J. Gregory Keyes
Fiction set in 1722
Del Rey books